Barry Mitchell (born 7 December 1965 in Yarrawonga) is a former Australian rules footballer who played with the Sydney Swans, Carlton and Collingwood in the Australian Football League (AFL).

Mitchell played as a rover and was consistently one of the top possession getters in the league every season. After retiring from Carlton in 1996, he kept involved with the club by becoming their runner.  He was promoted by the Blues to assistant coach in 2003, but left in 2007 to join Hawthorn, again as an assistant, and was part of the premiership team in 2008. He left the Hawks at the end of the premiership winning season to join Fremantle as an assistant coach. At the end of the 2011 season he left Fremantle to return to Melbourne after his son Tom Mitchell was drafted by the Sydney Swans under the father-son rule.

References

External links

1965 births
Living people
Australian rules footballers from Victoria (Australia)
Carlton Football Club players
Collingwood Football Club players
Sydney Swans players
Box Hill Football Club coaches
Preston Football Club (VFA) coaches
All-Australians (AFL)
Victorian State of Origin players
Bob Skilton Medal winners
New South Wales Australian rules football State of Origin players
E. J. Whitten Medal winners